Sumter Central High School is a senior high school in an unincorporated area of Sumter County, Alabama, between Livingston and York. It has  of space. It is a part of the Sumter County School District.

The school opened in 2011 as a merger of Livingston High School and Sumter County High School. It initially had 760 students. The impetus to merge came because of a declining population - the county had a total of 838 high school students divided between the two schools in 2009 - as well as the condition of Sumter County High and budget issues.

Sumter Central High School has a predominantly African American student body and most are from economically disadvantaged families.

References

External links
 Sumter Central High School

Schools in Sumter County, Alabama
Public high schools in Alabama
2011 establishments in Alabama
Educational institutions established in 2011